That Certain Feeling is an album by American organist John Patton recorded in 1968 and released on the Blue Note label.

Reception

The AllMusic review by Stephen Thomas Erlewine awarded the album 3½ stars and stated "there are moments when everything comes together and it just cooks. And those are the moments that make That Certain Feeling worth a search".

Track listing
All compositions by John Patton except where noted
 "String Bean" - 5:42
 "I Want to Go Home" - 8:36
 "Early A.M." - 7:17
 "Dirty Fingers" - 6:09
 "Minor Swing" - 6:38
 "Daddy James" (Jimmy Watson) - 6:47
Recorded at Rudy Van Gelder Studio, Englewood Cliffs, New Jersey on March 8, 1968.

Personnel
Big John Patton - organ
Junior Cook - tenor saxophone
Jimmy Ponder - guitar
Clifford Jarvis - drums

References

Blue Note Records albums
John Patton (musician) albums
1968 albums
Albums recorded at Van Gelder Studio
Albums produced by Alfred Lion